Jacques Banchereau is an internationally prominent French American immunologist and molecular biologist. As of 2022, he is Chief Scientific Officer at Immunai. He was formerly professor and director of immunological sciences at the Jackson Laboratory for Genomic Medicine and also the former chief science officer, senior vice president, and DTA (Discovery and Translational Area) head of inflammation & virology at Hoffman-La Roche. He is best known for his extensive research on dendritic cells with Nobel Laureate Ralph M. Steinman. He is the fifth most cited immunologist ranked by Times Higher Education's report.

Experience 
Banchereau was born in France. He graduated from University of Angers as a pharmacist in 1975. He completed his PhD study in biochemistry from University of Paris in 1980. Then he completed his post-doctorate study at Columbia University. During his PhD and post-doctorate time, he was involved with the discovery and functional analysis of GM-CSF, IL-4, IL-5, IL-10, IL-13, and IL-17. After his time at Columbia, he started his career as a scientist at Schering-Plough France in 1981, and quickly rose to the post of director for immunological research in 1984. In 1996, he left the company to found the Baylor Institute for Immunology Research. He served as adjunct professor at UT Southwestern Medical Center, and is now adjunct professor at Mount Sinai School of Medicine, Texas A&M University College of Dentistry, and Baylor University. In 2010, he joined Hoffman-La Roche at Nutley to become the chief scientific officer, senior vice president, and head of inflammation and virology. In 2012, he accepted the invitation from the Jackson Laboratory to be appointed as director of immunological sciences.

Research 
In addition to Banchereau's contribution on discovery of multiple interluekins and understanding them, his most well-known researches include the dendritic cells and vaccines. While Ralph M. Steinman discovered the dendritic cells, Banchereau was one of the first to find a way to grow them. His major work on dendritic cells include cancer vaccines and immunotherapy. He is the author of more than 300 peer-reviewed scientific articles and about 275 book chapters and reviews. He also holds 41 patents. His current research interest is on understanding RNA splicing for receptors.

Works 

 Banchereau, Jacques, and Ralph M. Steinman. "Dendritic cells and the control of immunity." Nature 392.6673 (1998): 245.
 Banchereau, Jacques, et al. "Immunobiology of dendritic cells." Annual review of immunology 18.1 (2000): 767–811.
 Steinman, Ralph M., and Jacques Banchereau. "Taking dendritic cells into medicine." Nature 449.7161 (2007): 419.
 Banchereau, Jacques, and A. Karolina Palucka. "Dendritic cells as therapeutic vaccines against cancer." Nature Reviews Immunology 5.4 (2005): 296.
 van Kooten, Cees, and Jacques Banchereau. "CD40‐CD40 ligand." Journal of leukocyte biology 67.1 (2000): 2-17.
 Banchereau, Jacques, et al. "Immune and clinical responses in patients with metastatic melanoma to CD34+ progenitor-derived dendritic cell vaccine." Cancer research 61.17 (2001): 6451–6458.
 Banchereau, Jacques, and Virginia Pascual. "Type I interferon in systemic lupus erythematosus and other autoimmune diseases." Immunity 25.3 (2006): 383–392.
 Banchereau, Jacques, et al. "Long-term human B cell lines dependent on interleukin-4 and antibody to CD40." Science251.4989 (1991): 70–72.
 Banchereau, Jacques, et al. "Dendritic cells as vectors for therapy." Cell 106.3 (2001): 271–274.

References 

Year of birth missing (living people)
Living people
University of Angers alumni
University of Paris alumni
French immunologists
American immunologists
Hoffmann-La Roche people
French emigrants to the United States